Nichallea is a monotypic genus of flowering plants belonging to the family Rubiaceae. It only contains one species, Nichallea soyauxii.

Its native range is western and western central Tropical Africa. It is found in the countries of Cabinda (Angola), Cameroon, Congo, Gabon, Ghana, Ivory Coast, Liberia, Nigeria, Sierra Leone and Zaïre.

The genus name of Nichallea is in honour of Nicolas Hallé, a French botanist at the National Museum of Natural History and was a specialist in Rubiaceae. The Latin specific epithet of soyauxii refers Hermann Soyaux (1852–1928), a German gardener, botanist and African explorer. Both the genus and the species were first described and published in Kew Bull. Vol.33 on page 288–290 in 1978.

References

Pavetteae
Rubiaceae genera
Plants described in 1978
Flora of West Tropical Africa
Flora of West-Central Tropical Africa
Taxa named by Diane Mary Bridson